The North Eastern Railway (NER) Class Y (LNER Class A7) 4-6-2T tank locomotives were designed whilst Wilson Worsdell was Chief Mechanical Engineer, but none were built until 1910 by which time Vincent Raven had taken over.

Overview
The Class Y locomotives were intended for hauling coal trains and were developed from the NER Class X (LNER Class T1) 4-8-0T heavy shunters. However, they had larger boilers and smaller cylinders for higher working speeds. Twenty were built in one batch and numbered between 1113 and 1195.

All twenty locomotives passed to the London and North Eastern Railway at the 1923 Grouping. They also fitted ten more locomotives with the 160 lbf/in2 superheated boilers that the LNER classified as diagram 55.

By the time the A7s entered LNER ownership in 1923, the A7s had been relegated to shunting in the larger marshalling yards. Their power was invaluable when shunting heavy trains over the shunting hump.  In the 1930s, Nos. 1136 and 1175 were allocated to hauling chalk quarry trains from Hessle Quarry to Stoneferry Cement Works, in the Hull area.

Heavy mineral traffic declined after the end of World War II, and the A7s moved to the Hull area, except for Nos. 1181 and 1192 which stayed at Stockton. At Hull, the A7s replaced the old Hull and Barnsley Railway (H&BR) types which were being withdrawn at that time.

During LNER ownership in the 1940s, two locomotives were rebuilt with diagram 63B superheated boilers pressed to 175 lbf/in2; the locomotives were then assigned to Class A7/1.

In the LNER 1946 renumbering scheme, the class received the 9770 to 9789 block; at nationalisation in 1948 all 20 locomotives passed to British Railways they were assigned the numbers 69770–69789, although the last locomotive was withdrawn before it was renumbered.

BR continued the rebuilding scheme, dealing with another 13 locomotives, although one received a diagram 63B saturated boiler and one a diagram 63C superheated one. Both were pressed to 175 lbf/in2.

Withdrawal
The A7s were withdrawn between 1951 and 1957 and none have survived into preservation.

Fleet list

References

External links
LNER Encyclopedia

Y
4-6-2T locomotives
Railway locomotives introduced in 1910
Scrapped locomotives
Standard gauge steam locomotives of Great Britain
Passenger locomotives